In Buri is the northernmost district (amphoe) of Sing Buri province in central Thailand.

History
In Buri is an ancient city, one of the major mueang or city states. It was built in the reign of King Ramesuan in 1369. In the Ayutthaya era, the governor of In Buri always was a royal family member because In Buri was a northern frontier city of Ayutthaya. The Thesaphiban administrative reforms of King Rama V downgraded In Buri to a subordinate of Sing Buri in 1895. It was converted into a district of Sing Buri Province later.

Geography
Neighboring districts are (from the north clockwise) Takhli of Nakhon Sawan province, Ban Mi of Lopburi province, Mueang Sing Buri and Bang Rachan of Sing Buri Province, and Sapphaya and Sankhaburi of Chai Nat province.

Administration
The district is divided into 10 sub-districts (tambons), which are further subdivided into 101 villages (mubans). In Buri itself is a sub-district municipality which covers parts of tambon In Buri. There are another 10 tambon administrative organizations (TAO).

References

External links
amphoe.com (Thai)

Districts of Singburi province
Former provinces of Thailand